Kahbad may refer to:
 Kahbad 1
 Kahbad 2